3628 Božněmcová, provisional designation , is a rare-type asteroid from the middle region of the asteroid belt, approximately 7 kilometers in diameter. It was discovered on 25 November 1979, by Czech astronomer Zdeňka Vávrová at Kleť Observatory in the Czech Republic. It is named for Czech writer Božena Němcová.

Orbit and classification 

Božněmcová orbits the Sun in the central main-belt at a distance of 1.8–3.3 AU once every 4.04 years (1,477 days). Its orbit has an eccentricity of 0.30 and an inclination of 7° with respect to the ecliptic.

Physical characteristics 

In the SMASS taxonomy, Božněmcová is a bright O-type asteroid, a rare group with spectra that best fits those of the L6 and LL6 ordinary chondrite-type meteorites.

Rotation period 

In September 2007, a rotational lightcurve of Božněmcová was obtained from photometric observations by American astronomer Brian Warner at his Palmer Divide Observatory in Colorado. Lightcurve analysis gave a well-defined rotation period of 3.335410 hours with a low brightness amplitude of 0.09 magnitude.

Diameter and albedo 

According to the surveys carried out by the Japanese Akari satellite and NASA's Wide-field Infrared Survey Explorer with its subsequent NEOWISE mission, Božněmcová measures between 5.40 and 8.14 kilometers in diameter, and its surface has an albedo between 0.256 and 0.359. The Collaborative Asteroid Lightcurve Link assumes a standard albedo for stony asteroids of 0.20 and calculates a diameter of 8.18 kilometers at an absolute magnitude of 12.8, as the lower the albedo (reflectivity), the larger the body's diameter for an unchanged brightness.

Naming 

This minor planet was named in memory of Božena Němcová (1820–1862), a Czech writer, author of the novella The Grandmother, the most frequently read book in Czech literature. The official naming citation was published by the Minor Planet Center on 4 June 1993.

References

External links 
 Lightcurve plot of 3628 Boznemcova, Palmer Divide Observatory, B. D. Warner (2007)
 Catchall Catalog of Minor Planets
 Asteroid Lightcurve Database (LCDB), query form (info )
 Dictionary of Minor Planet Names, Google books
 Asteroids and comets rotation curves, CdR – Observatoire de Genève, Raoul Behrend
 Discovery Circumstances: Numbered Minor Planets (1)-(5000) – Minor Planet Center
 
 

003628
Discoveries by Zdeňka Vávrová
Named minor planets
003628
19791125